David 'Davy' Byrne is a Gaelic footballer who plays for the Naomh Olaf  club and for the Dublin county team.

References

Living people
Dublin inter-county Gaelic footballers
Gaelic football backs
Naomh Ólaf Gaelic footballers
Sportspeople from Dublin (city)
Year of birth missing (living people)